Adina's Deck is a 2007 American DVD film series about internet safety and aimed toward 9- to 15-year-old children. The series is intended to be used alongside the series' official website and curriculum to inform and instruct children about cyberbullying and how to prevent it. The series was directed and written by Jason Azicri and Debbie Heimowitz, and was evaluated by Stanford University for its suitability as a teaching aid.

Synopsis
The series follows four girls who form a club to help their peers with mysteries by using technology.

Skye’s Cyber Bullying Mystery
When Skye (Kelcie Stranahan), the most popular girl in the 8th grade, starts to receive threatening emails, text messages and voice-mails, she doesn't know what to do. Her best friend Melody (Stephanie Cameron) asks the tech-savvy Adina (Amelia Varni) for help. When Adina says yes, her friend Clara (Cierra Trussell) is confused. Skye is stuck up, and has never been nice to them in the past, so why is Adina helping her? After an adventure, the girls learn about more than just the bully's identity—they learn about friendship and growing up in the digital age of technology.

The Case of the Online Crush
Michael (Sam Ison), a concerned 8th grader, approaches the Club with a difficult problem. His friend Ally (Nyssa Smikoski) has been talking to a guy online for over two months and it seems too good to be true—except the guy is 21! The club takes the case to track down Ally’s mysterious boyfriend and uncover his true identity.  After using technology and their detective sleuth skills, the club learns that young online relationships aren’t as romantic as they might seem.

The Case of the Plagiarized Paper
Dave (Kyle Fitz), a fellow 7th grade classmate needs help from the Club (Adina's deck). Someone in Mr. B’s class plagiarized their own paper and since Mr. B has a bell curve it affects everyone. Dave’s grade got lowered and that means if  his parents find out about it, they will be sending him to boarding school. Adina’s Deck takes the case in order to help Dave get the grade he deserves. In this who-done-it, there are four main suspects, and the club needs to investigate each  paper  to catch the cheater and save Dave . After a difficult case, the club learns about the true nature of plagiarism and that doing things right the first time just might be a trustworthy solution.

Cast
Main cast:

Recognition
The film has been used as resource in books, such as:
Cyber Bullying: A Prevention Curriculum for Grades 3-5, by Susan P. Limber, PD.D., Sue Limber, Robin M. Kowalski, Patricia W. Agatston, 
Bullying Beyond the Schoolyard: Preventing and Responding to Cyberbullying by Sameer Hinduja, Justin W. Patchi, 
Discovering Computers Fundamentals: Your Interactive Guide to the Digital World, by Gary Shelly, Misty Vermaat, 
Bullying Under Attack: True Stories Written by Teen Victims, Bullies & Bystanders, by Stephanie H. Meyer, John Meyer, Emily Sperber, 
and in multiple scholarly dissertations.

Awards
 2008, Won Best Short Film at the International Family Film Festival
 2008, Won Best Educational Film at the International Family Film Festival

See also

Cyberbullying

References

External links

Lights, Camera ... by Amelia Varni

American documentary films
Films about cyberbullying
2000s English-language films
2000s American films